Bishop of Edmonton may refer to:

Canada 
 Anglican Bishop of Edmonton (Alberta), of the Anglican Church of Canada
 Archbishop of Edmonton, of the (Latin) Catholic Church
 Bishop of Edmonton (Ukrainian), of the Ukrainian Greek Catholic Church
 Archbishop of Edmonton and Western Canada, of the Ukrainian Orthodox Church of Canada

United Kingdom 
 Bishop of Edmonton (London), an area bishop of the Church of England in the Diocese of London